Collinge is a surname. Notable people with the name include:

 Don Collinge (1909–1944), Canadian Olympic fencer
 Ernest Collinge (1895–1960), English footballer and the elder brother of Tom Collinge
 John Collinge (born 1939), a former president of the New Zealand National Party
 Patricia Collinge (1892–1974), Irish actress
 Rex Collinge (born 1935), English cricketer and Royal Air Force officer
 Richard Collinge (born 1946), New Zealand former cricketer
 Ross Collinge (born 1944), New Zealand former rower
 Tom Collinge (1898–1960), English footballer
 Tom Collinge (golfer) (born 1910), English professional golfer
 Walter Edward Collinge (1867–1947), British zoologist and museum curator

See also
 John Collinges (1623–1690), English presbyterian theologian, ejected minister and writer